German submarine U-365 was a Type VIIC U-boat built for Nazi Germany's Kriegsmarine for service during World War II.
She served exclusively against the Arctic Convoys from Britain to Murmansk and Archangelsk, principally targeting the Soviet forces which greeted the convoys in the Barents Sea.

Design
German Type VIIC submarines were preceded by the shorter Type VIIB submarines. U-364 had a displacement of  when at the surface and  while submerged. She had two shafts and two  propellers.

U-364 was fitted with five  torpedo tubes (four fitted at the bow and one at the stern), fourteen torpedoes, one  SK C/35 naval gun, 220 rounds, and two twin  C/30 anti-aircraft guns. The boat had a complement of between forty-four and sixty.

Service history
The boat was built in Flensburg in 1942 and 1943, U-365 was a Type VIIC U-boat, with five torpedo tubes and a deck gun for smaller targets. She was captained by Kptlt. Haimar Wedemeyer, an efficient if slightly cautious officer, who worked his boat and crew up before being dispatched to the 9th Flotilla based at Bergen, Norway, from which she conducted her first three patrols.

War patrols
U-365s early operations were in support of clandestine operations in the North Sea and Arctic Ocean, in the course of which she saw no action against Allied shipping or positions. Not until her fifth patrol, following a shift in patrol zones to the frozen seas around Novaya Zemlya and transfer to the 13th U-boat Flotilla, that U-365 experienced success. In this region, on the 12 August, the boat spotted a small Soviet convoy and in rapid order sank a 7,540 GRT freighter and the two 625 tons minesweepers intended to protect it.

However, due to the remoteness of the U-365s patrol zones, the cautiousness of her commander and the efficiency of Allied submarine defences by the autumn of 1944, Wedemeyer was unable to score another victory for his boat in the next two patrols, and was eventually replaced by Oblt.z.S. Diether Todenhagen, who had previously served on the enormously successful , and had a reputation as an aggressive submariner. This seemed deserved as on his first patrol, on the 6 December, he sank the tiny Soviet patrol ship BO-230 in the Barents Sea. This was followed five days later with a determined attack on an Allied convoy in which the British destroyer  was seriously damaged. However, in orchestrating the attack the U-boat's position was revealed, and just two days later two Fairey Swordfish aircraft from 813 Squadron flying from the escort carrier  spotted the submarine and sank her near the Lofoten Islands with bombs. All 50 of the U-boat's crew perished in the wreck.

Wolfpacks
U-365 took part in six wolfpacks, namely:
 Trutz (28 June – 10 July 1944) 
 Greif (5 – 18 August 1944) 
 Zorn (29 September – 1 October 1944) 
 Grimm (1 – 2 October 1944) 
 Panther (18 October – 8 November 1944) 
 Stier (25 November – 13 December 1944)

Summary of raiding history

References

Notes

Citations

Bibliography

External links

German Type VIIC submarines
World War II shipwrecks in the Norwegian Sea
U-boats sunk by British aircraft
U-boats commissioned in 1943
U-boats sunk in 1944
Barents Sea
Military in the Arctic
1943 ships
Ships built in Flensburg
World War II submarines of Germany
Ships lost with all hands
Maritime incidents in December 1944